Nikos Chrysogelos  (born 13 May 1959, in Sifnos) is a Greek chemist and politician. In 2012, he replaced Michalis Tremopoulos as a member of the European Parliament (MEP) for the Ecologist Greens. In 2014 he however left his party to found the new Greens party which in the January 2015 legislative election formed a common electoral list with Democratic Left, but missed the 3% electoral threshold.

References

External links
 
 

1959 births
Living people
People from Sifnos
Greek chemists
Ecologist Greens MEPs
MEPs for Greece 2009–2014